"Two Divided by Love" is a 1971 hit song by The Grass Roots.  It was the first single released from their sixth studio album, Move Along.

The song reached number 16 on the US Billboard Hot 100 and number 2 in Canada.

Chart performance

Weekly charts

Year-end charts

Personnel  
 Jimmie Haskell – horns arrangement
 Phil Kaye – engineering

References

External links 
 

1971 singles
The Grass Roots songs
ABC Records singles
1971 songs
Songs written by Dennis Lambert
Songs written by Brian Potter (musician)
The Kendalls songs